Gathera is a settlement in Kenya's Central Province about 87 kilometers from the Kenyan capital of Nairobi.

Statistics
There is an infant mortality of 44 per 1000 births. Malnutrition is apparent as 1.54% of children below five years old are underweight. Most of the land coverage is open broadleaved deciduous forest. The Cultivation Intensity is about 20% cultivated, and 80% natural vegetation.

Schools
Gathera Secondary School is located at 2- 10205 Chinga-Kairu Road.

References

Populated places in Central Province (Kenya)